The Rocky Mountain Elk Foundation (RMEF) is a conservation and pro-hunting organization, founded in the United States in 1984 by four hunters from Troy, Montana (Bob Munson, Bill Munson, Dan Bull and Charlie Decker). Its mission is to ensure the future of elk, other wildlife, their habitat and American hunting heritage. In support of this mission the RMEF is committed to:
 Conserving, restoring, and enhancing natural habitats;
 Promoting the sound management of wild, free-ranging elk, which may be hunted or otherwise enjoyed;
 Fostering cooperation among federal, state, tribal, and private organizations and individuals in wildlife management and habitat conservation; and
 Educating members and the public about habitat conservation, the value of hunting, hunting ethics, and wildlife management.

Since 1984, the RMEF helped to conserve more than 6.7 million acres (26,700 km²) of habitat.  RMEF also helped to restore long-absent elk populations, with herds being reestablished in Kentucky, North Carolina, Ontario, Tennessee, Missouri, Virginia and Wisconsin. RMEF strives to be a strong voice for hunters in access, wildlife management, and conservation policy issues.

The Rocky Mountain Elk Foundation believes that hunting is conservation, that every citizen is entitled to hunt and fish, and that science-based, state-regulated hunting drives wildlife conservation and management.

In September 2020, The Rocky Mountain Elk Foundation and its partners supported $2.6 million in wildlife protection in Colorado.

Torstenson Family Endowment
In 2002, Bob Torstenson endowed the 93,403 acre (378 km²) Double H Ranch, later named the Torstenson Wildlife Center, in west-central New Mexico to the Rocky Mountain Elk Foundation. In 2012 the RMEF, working with the Torstenson family, made a gift transition of the ranch resulting in the establishment of the Torstenson Family Endowment (TFE), one of the largest endowments ever for a wildlife conservation organization. The ranch is forever protected and conserved through a conservation easement maintained by the RMEF.

RMEF will use proceeds from the TFE exclusively to further its core mission programs: permanent land protection, habitat stewardship, elk restoration and hunting heritage. The TFE allows RMEF to increase project funding by attracting matching funds both from the private and public sectors, and allows RMEF to much more quickly meet and head off the habitat changes and challenges taking place across the United States.

Legislation
The Rocky Mountain Elk Foundation supported the Bipartisan Sportsmen's Act of 2014 (S. 2363; 113th Congress), which would have exempted lead-based ammunition from regulation under the Toxic Substances Control Act. They urged members to support the bill, saying that it considers the bill "to be of vital importance for conservation, wildlife, and sportsmen and women." The Rocky Mountain Elk Foundation said that they supported the bill because it "protects the use of traditional ammunition, allows more flexibility for federal funds to be used to build and maintain ranges on public lands and ensures access to federal lands for hunting, shooting and other outdoor activities."

Television Show 
The Rocky Mountain Elk Foundation produces a television show called, "RMEF Team Elk" hosted by Brandon Bates. The show focuses on elk, elk habitat and elk hunting and features the importance of conservation and hunting heritage.

See also
Mule Deer Foundation
Boone and Crockett Club
Ducks Unlimited
National Wild Turkey Federation
Theodore Roosevelt Conservation Partnership
Union Sportsmen's Alliance

References

External links
Official website
Official RMEF Team Elk CarbonTV Channel

Environmental organizations based in the United States
Nature conservation organizations based in the United States
Hunting in the United States
Non-profit organizations based in Montana
Organizations based in Missoula, Montana
1984 establishments in Montana
Organizations established in 1984